The Byram Bridge, spanning the Pearl River between Hinds County, Mississippi and Rankin County, Mississippi, is a historic bridge which was listed on the National Register of Historic Places in 1979.

The bridge was built in 1905 as a collaboration between merchants in Byram, Mississippi and Rankin County. In 1987, the bridge was deemed unsafe for travel and was closed to traffic. The bridge was converted to a pedestrian footbridge in 2015.

It is located at Old Byram and Florence Rd. near Frenchs Store, Mississippi.

References

External links

Bridges on the National Register of Historic Places in Mississippi
Suspension bridges
National Register of Historic Places in Hinds County, Mississippi
National Register of Historic Places in Rankin County, Mississippi
Bridges completed in 1905
1905 establishments in Mississippi
Pearl River (Mississippi–Louisiana)
Pedestrian bridges on the National Register of Historic Places